Naujas Strūnaitis is a village in the Švenčionys District Municipality.  The village is located directly south of the city of Švenčionys.

References 

Vilnius Voivodeship
Švenčionys District Municipality
Villages in Vilnius County